The Fairhill Centre is a shopping centre located in Ballymena, County Antrim, Northern Ireland. It contains over 50 stores and a food court and has parking for over 1,100 cars in a multi-storey car park. It is open seven days a week. Anchor tenants include Next, New Look and Marks & Spencer. In 2007 Debenhams opened its first Desire fashion store in Ireland at the Centre.

Landlords of the Centre, Corbo Ltd, confirmed the 2009 closure of the Bhs Store, which would undergo redevelopment before being handed over to Next and New Look. Both stores opened in 2009.

Rail access

References

Ballymena
Shopping centres in Northern Ireland
Buildings and structures in County Antrim